Lan-Hing Tam (1908–1981) was a Chinese actress and Cantonese opera singer from Hong Kong. Tam was credited with over 190 films.

Early life 
In 1908, Tam was born as Tam Shui-fen.

Career 
Tam started her career as a "fa dan" role in Cantonese opera. In 1935, Tam crossed over as an actress in Hong Kong films. Tam first appeared in Scent of Wild Flowers, a 1935 Drama film directed by So Yi. Tam first appeared as a comedian actress in Modern Girl Seeks Husband, a 1939 Comedy film directed by So Yi. As a comedian, Tam is known to utilize her overweight physical feature for comedy effects. Tam earned a nickname of "Plumpy Lan". Tam cross-dressed as a male and appeared as Tang general Ching Ngau-kam in Fan Lei-Fa, the Female General (aka Fan Li-Fa, The Story of Heroine Fan Lei-fa), a 1968 Cantonese opera film directed by Fung Chi-Kong. Tam's last film was Money from Heaven, a 1969 Comedy film directed by Ng Wui. Tam is credited with over 190 films.

Filmography

Films 
This is a partial list of films.
 1935 Scent of Wild Flowers 
 1939 Rivals in Love – mother 
 1941 A Mother's Madness 
 1956 Fatty Marries Skinny (aka Fatso Married Skinny) – Secretary.
 1957 The Fairy in the Picture – Mother.
 1957 Romance of Jade Hall (Part 1) (aka My Kingdom for a Husband) – Lolo.
 1959 A Stroke of Romance for Mr. Wong – wife.
 1959 Daughter of a Grand Household (aka The Missing Cinderella) – Hung's aunt.
 1960 Silly Wong Growing Rich – Ho Bit-Siu 
 1960 The Stubborn Generations – Madam Tang 
 1962 Matrimonial Storm (aka To Plunder a Wife) – Madam Ho.
 1962 The Thunderous Night – Snobbish mother of a soldier.
 1962 To Capture the God of Wealth (aka Fake Saviour) – Wife.
 1963 Three Fools Searching for Their Daughter – Mother.
 1964 Filial Sons and Grandchildren (aka Our Family) – Snobbish mother-in-law.
 1968 Fan Lei-Fa, the Female General (aka Fan Li-Fa, The Story of Heroine Fan Lei-fa) – Tang general Ching Ngau-kam. Cross-dressed as a male.
 1969 Money from Heaven

Personal life 
In 1981, Tam died in Hong Kong.

References

External links 
 Tam Lan Hing at hkcinemagic.com
 Lan-Hing Tam at imdb.com

1908 births
1981 deaths
Chinese women comedians
Hong Kong Cantonese opera actresses
Hong Kong film actresses